Joan Velasco Alarilla is a Filipino politician who was mayor of Meycauayan from 2007 until 2016. Alarilla ran for the congressional seat for the 4th District in the 2016 elections, but she lost to Linabelle Villarica.

Controversy
In March 2017, The Sandiganbayan found Alarilla guilty of serious dishonesty and grave misconduct She is over ghost projects, including the construction of basketball courts, kindergarten, and more. Following that, Ombudsman Conchita Carpio-Morales bars her for holding public office.

Personal life
Alarilla is married to Eduardo Alarilla Jr., former mayor of their city. He died of lingering sickness on March 5, 2009.

References

Year of birth missing (living people)
Living people
Mayors of places in Bulacan